Unione Sportiva Ciserano, commonly referred to as Ciserano, is an Italian football club based in Ciserano, Lombardy. Currently it plays in Italy's Serie D.

History

Foundation
The club was founded in 1951.

Serie D
In the season 2013–14 the team was promoted, from Eccellenza Lombardy/B to Serie D.

Colors and badge
The team's colors are red and blue.

References

Football clubs in Italy
Football clubs in Lombardy
Association football clubs established in 1951
1951 establishments in Italy